Montgomery is an unincorporated community in Scott County, Tennessee, United States.

Unincorporated communities in Tennessee
Unincorporated communities in Scott County, Tennessee